Metamorphosis  is a 2012 feature film adaptation of Franz Kafka's classic 1915 novella Die Verwandlung (The Metamorphosis), adapted and directed by Chris Swanton. To celebrate the first publication of Franz Kafka's iconic novella in book form in 1916, the film's London-based production company, Attractive Features Ltd, has brought out this Centenary Edition with new CGI, the addition of a narrator (Tim Pigott-Smith) and specially-written opening music.
The film's cast leads with Maureen Lipman, and Robert Pugh, and also stars Laura Rees, Chloe Howman, Alistair Petrie, Janet Henfrey, Aiden McArdle, Paul Thornley, Liam McKenna and is narrated by Tim Pigott-Smith.

Synopsis
Metamorphosis is the story of traveling salesman Gregor Samsa, who wakes one morning to find himself transformed in his bed into a giant, verminous, insect-like creature. His transformation into a hideous parasite is a cry for help, but his craving for understanding and love is not met. His idle teenage sister jealously dominates his care, his hitherto slothful father is bitter about the loss of family income, and his weak and asthmatic mother can only look on ineffectively as Gregor's fate unfolds. Gregor's craving for emotional fulfilment is met by misunderstanding and ultimately physical abuse. He is attacked by his father, who penetrates his insect shell with a vicious bombardment of rock-hard apples and is prevented from killing Gregor only by the desperate intervention of his mother. The sister he has always cherished finally turns on him viciously and demands his disappearance, a demand that Gregor inwardly accepts has to be carried out. Imprisoned in his increasingly neglected room, he wastes away from the lack of the right kind of sustenance and finally dies of the great wound in his back and in his heart. At his death, the brutish charlady sweeps away his remains and his family are released from their dreadful burden to celebrate their prospects for a brighter future.

Cast

 Robert Pugh as Mr Samsa
 Maureen Lipman as Mrs Samsa
 Laura Rees as Grete Samsa
 Chloe Howman as Anna
 Alistair Petrie as The Supervisor
 Aidan McArdle as The First Lodger
 Paul Thornley as the Second Lodger and the Voice of Gregor Samsa
 Liam McKenna as the Third Lodger
 Janet Henfrey as The Cleaning Lady
 Tim Pigott-Smith, Narrator

Crew
 Director - Chris Swanton
 Visual Effects Director - William Rockall
 Producer Lesley McNeil
 Director of Photography - John Daly
 Production Designer -Humphrey Jaeger
 Costume Designer - Christine Rawlins
 Sound Recordist - Tim Humphries
 Art Director - Jenny Ray
 Film Editor - Chris Toft

Production
Attractive Features was set up by film editor Chris Swanton with the express purpose of making the first-ever, English-language film version of Kafka's iconic novella. Rockkiss was established by award-winning visual effects director William Rockall together with visual effects designer and producer, Simon Hodgkiss.

Release
The Academic Edition of the film was released on DVD in January 2014 together with the companion Teacher's Handbook and Student's Textbook. These items have now been withdrawn and  replaced by the Centenary Edition, composed of the feature film and the complementary documentary Behind the Scenes as well as the companion paperback with fresh translation and detailed commentary.

All Showings
 Montreal World Film Festival 2012
 B-Movie Celebration Festival 2012
 Ojai Film Festival 2012
 Oaxaca Film Festival 2012
 Sci-Fi London Film Festival 2012
 Houston World Filmfest 2013
GCSE Drama PMS

References

External links 
 
 

2012 films
Films based on works by Franz Kafka
2010s English-language films